Vassilis Christidis (alternate spellings: Vasilis, Vasileos) (born July 10, 1998) is a Greek professional basketball player for Aris of the Greek Basket League. He is a 2.08 m (6'10") tall power forward-center.

Professional career
Christidis started playing basketball with the youth teams of Mantoulidis. He then played in the Greek minors with Mantoulidis. He signed a contract with Aris in 2015, but he was loaned back to Mantoulidis for the 2015–16 season.

Christidis began his pro career in 2016, with the top-tier level Greek League club Aris, when he debuted in a Greek League game against Promitheas Patras. He joined Olympiacos' new reserve team of the Greek 2nd Division, Olympiacos B, for the 2019–20 season. 

On December 21, 2021, Christidis was loaned from Olympiacos to Peristeri, under coach Milan Tomić. In 13 league games, he averaged 7 points, 4.6 rebounds, 1.3 assists and 0.3 blocks, playing around 18 minutes per contest.

On July 7, 2022, Christidis moved to PAOK. On January 25, 2022, he parted ways with the team. In 11 league games, he averaged 2.5 points and 1.7 rebounds per contest. On January 27 of the same year, he returned to Aris.

National team career

Greek junior national team
As a member of the Greek junior national teams, Christidis played at the 2014 FIBA Europe Under-16 Championship, and at the 2015 FIBA Europe Under-18 Championship, where he won a gold medal. He also played at the 2017 FIBA Europe Under-20 Championship, where he won a gold medal.

Greek senior national team
Christidis became a member of the Greece men's national basketball team in 2017.

References

External links
FIBA Champions League Profile
FIBA Profile
FIBA Europe Profile
Eurobasket.com Profile
Greek Basket League Profile 
Greek Basket League Profile 
Octagon Profile

1998 births
Living people
Aris B.C. players
Centers (basketball)
Greek men's basketball players
Olympiacos B.C. players
Olympiacos B.C. B players
P.A.O.K. BC players
Peristeri B.C. players
Power forwards (basketball)
Basketball players from Thessaloniki